The following television stations broadcast on digital or analog channel 32 in Mexico:

 XEW-TDT in Mexico City
 XEWT-TDT in Tijuana, Baja California
 XHACN-TDT in Acaponeta y Tecuala, Nayarit 
 XHAGU-TDT in Aguascalientes, Aguascalientes 
 XHANT-TDT in Autlán de Navarro, Jalisco 
 XHAP-TDT in Acapulco, Guerrero 
 XHAUC-TDT in Chihuahua, Chihuahua 
 XHAZL-TDT in Cerro Azul, Veracruz
 XHBO-TDT in Oaxaca, Oaxaca 
 XHBUR-TDT in Morelia, Michoacán de Ocampo 
 XHCUA-TDT in Culiacán, Sinaloa 
 XHDRG-TDT in Durango, Durango 
 XHHUC-TDT in Huixtla (El Triunfo), Chiapas 
 XHI-TDT in Ciudad Obregón, Sonora
 XHIJ-TDT in Ciudad Juárez, Chihuahua
 XHLRT-TDT in San Luis Rio Colorado, Sonora
 XHMOY-TDT in Monterrey, Nuevo León
 XHNAT-TDT in Nuevo Laredo, Tamaulipas
 XHOCC-TDT in Ocosingo, Chiapas
 XHOPCC-TDT in Campeche, Campeche
 XHPNG-TDT in Piedras Negras, Coahuila
 XHPNO-TDT in Santiago Pinotepa Nacional, Oaxaca 
 XHSTE-TDT in Santiago Tuxtla, Veracruz
 XHSZT-TDT in Soto La Marina, Tamaulipas
 XHTMPT-TDT in Puebla, Puebla
 XHTMQR-TDT in Cancún, Quintana Roo
 XHVIZ-TDT in Villahermosa, Tabasco
 XHVST-TDT in Ciudad Valles, San Luis Potosí
 XHVTT-TDT in Valladolid and Tizimín, Yucatán 
 XHWVT-TDT in Arriaga and Tonalá, Chiapas 
 XHZ-TDT in Querétaro, Querétaro

32